is a Japanese actor.

Filmography
 Kamen Rider 555: Paradise Lost (2003) as Keitaro Kikuchi
 Kamen Rider 555 (2003) as Keitaro Kikuchi

External links
 
 

1980 births
Living people
Japanese male actors
People from Yamanashi Prefecture
21st-century Japanese male actors